Miftengris is a monotypic genus of Asian dwarf spiders containing the single species, Miftengris scutumatus. It was first described by K. Y. Eskov in 1993, and has only been found in Russia.

See also
 List of Linyphiidae species (I–P)

References

Linyphiidae
Monotypic Araneomorphae genera
Spiders of Russia